Burg  is an unincorporated community in Bollinger County, Missouri, United States. The name is a common designation and is related to the establishment of a post office. When asked, "What shall we call this burg?", no satisfactory answer was given, so the name "Burg" was suggested to postal authorities. The post office was maintained from 1908–1910.

The Geographic Names Information System has an entry for Burg Post Office (historical) with a location of unknown.

References 

Unincorporated communities in Bollinger County, Missouri
Cape Girardeau–Jackson metropolitan area
Unincorporated communities in Missouri